Horelophus is a beetle genus in the family Hydrophilidae. This genus is monotypic. Its sole species is Horelophus walkeri.

References 

Beetles of New Zealand
Monotypic beetle genera
Hydrophilidae